is an animated Japanese propaganda film produced in 1942 by Geijutsu Eigasha and released March 25, 1943. Running at 37 minutes, it was close to being feature-length, but it was not the first animated feature film in Asia; that honor goes to China's 1941 Princess Iron Fan, which was 73 minutes long. A DVD version without English subtitles was released in Japan by Kinokuniya Shoten in 2004; one with subtitles was released in the United States by Zakka Films in 2009.

Although recorded as being produced with the cooperation of the Japanese Naval Ministry, there was in fact no cooperation in order to protect military secrets, although the Japanese Imperial Navy endorsed the film.

Featuring the "Peach Boy" character of Japanese folklore, this film was aimed at children, telling the story of a naval unit consisting of the human Momotarō and several animal species representing the Far Eastern races fighting together for a common goal. In a dramatization of the attack on Pearl Harbor, this force attacks the demons at the island of Onigashima (representing the Americans and British demonized in Japanese propaganda), and the film also utilizes actual footage of the Pearl Harbor attack.
A sequel, Momotarō Umi no Shinpei, was released in 1945, becoming the first full-length Japanese animated film.

Plot summary 
The video opens aboard an aircraft carrier on tumultuous waters, with squadrons of monkeys, pheasants, and dogs prepping their planes for war. These animals are not the perfect soldiers; they act silly, giving them a very human feel. At the center stands Momotaro, stoic and heroic, giving orders. The animals board their planes and take into the sky. The flight to Hawaii is uninterrupted save for a monkey helping a lost baby bird find its parent.

The animals arrive and the attack begins. The soldiers aboard the ships docked in Pearl Harbor panic and scramble, trying to flee; evidenced by a copious amount of bottles lying around, some are too drunk to move or think properly. The main soldier shown is dumb, fat, and cowardly.

The attack continues, some monkeys go on land to destroy American planes. The main American soldier literally shakes the red and blue off the American flag to wave it as a white flag of surrender. Pearl Harbor is left in smoking ruins as the animals return to the aircraft carrier to celebrate.

Momotaro's Sea Eagles as Propaganda 
The Japanese government used Momotaro as the hero because that story was and continues to be as well-known to Japanese citizens as "The Three Little Pigs" is to Americans. In the film, Momotaro and the animals were cute and already known as heroic characters, and the "pretty characters and comical battle scenes enabled Japanese citizens to watch a war movie without hesitation". In other words, the film was entertaining to the masses. In addition, the original story has Momotaro and his companions traveling to a demon-inhabited island, which this film replaced with the American-infested Hawaii, creating an easy link between foreigners and evil creatures.

Between 1942 and 1945, "national policy films" (AKA propaganda films) took up a large percentage of the Japanese cinema. Momotaro's Sea Eagles was an extremely successful example of this; it was especially popular among young children. The 37-minute film was so popular, in fact, that Seo made a 74-minute sequel, Momotaro's Divine Sea Warriors, which debuted in 1945. The cute and entertaining movie in which there are no shown fatalities gave the war a soft, righteous cause feel to the citizens in the audience.

Trivia
Bluto, from the Popeye cartoons being produced in America at the time, makes an appearance in this film as a stereotypical drunk. This is one of few examples of the Axis nations using American cartoon characters to portray the United States in animated films, just as the Allied forces used Hitler, Mussolini, and Hirohito, as well as Nazis and Japanese soldiers in their propaganda films.

References

External links

 
Stills from the movie

1943 anime films
Fantasy anime and manga
Japanese World War II propaganda films
1940s animated short films
Anime short films
Films directed by Mitsuyo Seo
Japanese black-and-white films